Alfred may refer to:

Arts and entertainment

Alfred J. Kwak, Dutch-German-Japanese anime television series
Alfred (Arne opera), a 1740 masque by Thomas Arne
Alfred (Dvořák), an 1870 opera by Antonín Dvořák
"Alfred (Interlude)" and "Alfred (Outro)", songs by Eminem from the 2020 album Music to Be Murdered By

Business and organisations
 Alfred, a radio station in Shaftesbury, England
Alfred Music, an American music publisher
Alfred University, New York, U.S.
The Alfred Hospital, a hospital in Melbourne, Australia

People
 Alfred (name) includes a list of people and fictional characters called Alfred
 Alfred the Great (848/49 – 899), or Alfred I, a king of the West Saxons and of the Anglo-Saxons

Places

Antarctica
 Mount Alfred (Antarctica)

Australia
 Alfredtown, New South Wales
 County of Alfred, South Australia

Canada
 Alfred and Plantagenet, Ontario
 Alfred Island, Nunavut
 Mount Alfred, British Columbia

United States
 Alfred, Maine, a New England town
 Alfred (CDP), Maine, the main village in the town
 Alfred, New York, a town
 Alfred (village), New York, within the town of Alfred
 Alfred, North Dakota
 Alfred, Texas
 Lake Alfred, Florida

Other uses
HMS Alfred, the name of several ships of the Royal Navy
USS Alfred, launched in 1774 as Black Prince
Alfred (software), an application launcher for macOS
ALFRED (nuclear reactor), lead-cooled fast reactor demonstrator
Allele Frequency Database, an electronic database of genetic alleles

See also
Alfredo (disambiguation)
HMS King Alfred
HMS Royal Alfred (1864)